The Kazan Kremlin Cup is a professional tennis tournament played on indoor hard courts. The event is part of the ATP Challenger Tour. The men's event began in 2010.

Past finals

Men's singles

Men's doubles

External links 
  

 
Kazan Kremlin Cup
Kazan Kremlin Cup
Kazan Kremlin Cup
Kazan Kremlin Cup
Recurring sporting events established in 2010
Sport in Kazan